The Western Baltic languages were a group of Baltic languages that were spoken by Western Baltic peoples. Western Baltic is one of the two primary branches of Baltic languages, along with Eastern Baltic. It includes Old Prussian, Sudovian, Western Galindian, possibly Skalvian and Old Curonian.

Attestation 
The only properly attested Western Baltic language of which texts are known is Old Prussian, although there are a few short remnants of Old Curonian and Sudovian in the form of isolated words and short phrases. Many Western Baltic languages went extinct in the 16th century while Old Prussian ceased to be spoken in the early 18th century.

Classification
The only languages securely classified as Western Baltic are Old Prussian and West Galindian, which could also be a dialect of Old Prussian.

Most scholars consider Skalvian to be a Western Baltic language or dialect. Another possible classification is a transitional language between Western and Eastern Baltic.

Sudovian is either classified as an Old Prussian dialect, a Western Baltic language or a transitional language between Western and Eastern Baltic. The former two options would leave Sudovian in the Western Baltic phylum.

Old Curonian is the least securely classified language. It is argued to be either Western Baltic with significant Eastern Baltic influence, or Eastern Baltic.

History 
Western Baltic was presumably native to the north of Central Europe, especially modern Poland, and the western Baltic region, which includes parts of modern Latvia and Lithuania. The Western Baltic branch probably fully separated from Eastern Baltic around the 4th–3rd century BCE, although their differences go as far as the middle of the last millennium BC.

Linguistic features 
The Western Baltic languages were more archaic. Unlike their Eastern counterparts, Western Balts retained the diphthong *ei (e. g.,  'god', acc. They also preserved three genders: masculine, feminine and neuter. Sudovian and Old Curonian shared the suffix -ng-, which can be observed in various hydronyms and oeconyms (e. g., Apsingė, Nedzingė, Pilvingis, Suvingis, Palanga, Alsunga) found in southern Lithuania, western Lithuania and Latvia.

References 

Baltic languages
West Baltic languages